The first inversion of a chord is the voicing of a triad, seventh chord, or ninth chord in which the third of the chord is the bass note and the root a sixth above it. In the first inversion of a C-major triad, the bass is E — the third of the triad — with the fifth and the root stacked above it (the root now shifted an octave higher), forming the intervals of a minor third and a minor sixth above the inverted bass of E, respectively.

In the first inversion of G-dominant seventh chord, the bass note is B, the third of the seventh chord.

In figured bass, a first-inversion triad is a  chord (not to be confused with an added sixth chord), while a first-inversion seventh chord is a  chord.

According to The American History and Encyclopedia of Music:

Note that any voicing above the bass is allowed. A first inversion chord must have the third chord factor in the bass, but it may have any arrangement of the root and fifth above that, including doubled notes, compound intervals, and omission (E-G-C, E-G-C-G', E-C'-G'', etc.)

See also

Figured bass
Inversion (music)
Root position
Second inversion
Third inversion
Fourth inversion

References

Chord factors
Chords
Voicing (music)